The Sang-O (Shark) class of submarines (Hangul: 상어급 잠수함) are diesel-electric coastal submarines in service with the Korean People's Navy, the navy of North Korea. They are the country's second largest indigenously-built submarines.

Though North Korean military capabilities are mostly kept classified, it was reported that North Korea maintains 40 Sang-O-class submarines as of February 2021.

History
The Sang-O-class was introduced in 1991, produced at Bong Dao Bo Shipyards in Sinpo.

A single unit was captured by the Republic of Korea Navy (South Korea) after it ran aground on 18 September 1996 in the Gangneung submarine infiltration incident.

The seized Sang-O-class submarine was placed on display at Unification Park near Gangneung, which was opened on 26 September 2001.

Design

The Sang-O-class was reported to be larger than a midget submarine, but smaller than the Romeo and Whiskey-class submarines. They're usually equipped with four 533mm torpedo tubes and 16 mines, but some are unarmed and are used to carry North Korean commandos.

New class
It was reported in March 2011 that a new version of the Sang-O class had been deployed in North Korea. Satellite imagery from 2005 suggests the Sang-O II / K-300 may have been produced at the Mayang-do naval base and fitted out at the dry docks located at 39.9978 N, and 128.20019 E.

Other footage of the nearby docks of Sinp'o appear to depict the Sang-O II / K-300 as early as 2004 (at 40 01'31.20"N 128 09'55.80"E). Subsequent satellite imagery shows the Sang-O II / K-300 deployed to the Ch’aho-rodongjagu submarine Navy Base at 40.205441 N 128.649524 E on North Korea's east coast.

According to the KPA Journal, the decision to develop a larger, improved version of the Sang-O came in the late 1990s or early 2000. The Sang-O II / K-300 is a stretched version of the original Sang-O class with an approximate length of 39 to 40 metres and a corresponding surface displacement of approximately 300 to 340 tons.

The increased length and internal volume would suggest an increase in the operational range of the submarine and troop/equipment carrying capabilities. Top speed is also reported to be higher in the new model, meaning an improved propulsion system is possibly housed in some of the extra length.

References

Bibliography
 

Submarines of the Korean People's Navy
Submarine classes